The 1838–39 United States House of Representatives elections were held on various dates in various states between July 2, 1838 and November 5, 1839. Each state set its own date for its elections to the House of Representatives before the first session of the 26th United States Congress convened on December 2, 1839. They occurred during President Martin Van Buren's term. Elections were held for all 242 seats, representing 26 states.

The Panic of 1837 and consequent economic downturn drove Whig Party gains. Van Buren's Democratic Party had lost popularity and Whig policies of economic nationalism appealed to a larger number of voters. Democrats were able, however, to contain the political fallout by blaming banks for the crisis. The Anti-Masonic Party, influential in New York, Pennsylvania, and other Northern states, lost seats, while the Southern Nullifier Party disappeared. Two Virginia representatives were elected on that state's Conservative Party ticket.

Early business of the new House reflected the close partisan division. When Congress first Convened on December 3, 1839, two contingents of New Jersey representatives-elect, one composed of Democrats and the other of Whigs, arrived and both requested to be seated as members. Charging the Whigs with election fraud and facing loss of control of the House, the Democratic Party majority (119 to 118 Whigs from outside New Jersey) refused to seat all but one Whig. Massachusetts Representative John Quincy Adams presided as "chairman" of the House after the clerk lost control. 
Two weeks later, when voting for speaker of the House finally commenced, 11 ballots were needed before Robert M. T. Hunter, a compromise Whig candidate, was elected, receiving 119 votes (out of 232 cast). This congress also enacted the first Independent Treasury bill.

Election summaries

Special elections 

There were special elections in 1838 and 1839 to the 25th United States Congress and 26th United States Congress.

Special elections are listed by date then district.

25th Congress 

|-
! 
| 
| 
| 
| New member elected March 8, 1838.
|
|-
! 
| 
| 
| 
| New member elected April 28, 1838.
|
|-
! 
| 
| 
| 
| New member elected May 29, 1838.
|
|-
! rowspan=2 | 
| John F. H. Claiborne
|  | Democratic
| 1835
| rowspan=2  | The House rescinded its former decision February 5, 1838 and declared the seats vacant.New members elected May 29, 1838.Two Whig gains.Successors seated May 30, 1838.
| rowspan=2 nowrap | 

|-
| Samuel J. Gholson
|  | Democratic
| 1836 

|-
! 
| 
| 
| 
| New member elected October 9, 1838.
|
|-
! 
| 
| 
| 
| New member elected November 5, 1838.
|
|-
! 
| Stephen C. Phillips
|  | Whig
| 1834 
|  | Incumbent resigned September 28, 1838 to become Mayor of Salem.New member elected November 12, 1838.Whig hold.Successor also elected the same day to the next term, see below.
| nowrap | 

|}

26th Congress 

|-
! 
| Albert G. Harrison
|  | Democratic
| 1835
|  | New member elected.October 28, 1839 and seated December 5, 1839.Democratic hold.
| nowrap | 

|-
! 
| Richard Fletcher
|  | Whig
| 1836
|  | Incumbent member-elect declined to serve.New member elected November 11, 1839.Whig hold.
| nowrap | 

|-
! 
| 
| 
| 
| New member elected November 20, 1839.
|
|-
! 
| James C. Alvord
|  | Whig
| 1838
|  | Incumbent died September 27, 1839.New member elected December 23, 1839 on the second ballot.Whig hold.
| nowrap | 

|}

Alabama

Arkansas

Connecticut 

Connecticut elected its six members April 1, 1839, flipping all six seats from Democratic to Whig.

|-
! 
| Isaac Toucey
|  | Democratic
| 1835
|  | Incumbent lost re-election.New member elected.Whig gain.
| nowrap | 

|-
! 
| Samuel Ingham
|  | Democratic
| 1835
|  | Incumbent lost re-election.New member elected.Whig gain.
| nowrap | 

|-
! 
| Elisha Haley
|  | Democratic
| 1835
|  | Incumbent retired.New member elected.Whig gain.
| nowrap | 

|-
! 
| Thomas T. Whittlesey
|  | Democratic
| 1836 
|  | Incumbent lost re-election.New member elected.Whig gain.
| nowrap | 

|-
! 
| Lancelot Phelps
|  | Democratic
| 1835
|  | Incumbent retired.New member elected.Whig gain.
| nowrap | 

|-
! 
| Orrin Holt
|  | Democratic
| 1836 
|  | Incumbent retired.New member elected.Whig gain.
| nowrap | 

|}

Delaware

Florida Territory 
See Non-voting delegates, below.

Georgia

Illinois

Indiana

Iowa Territory 
See Non-voting delegates, below.

Kentucky

Louisiana

Maine 

|-
! 

|-
! 

|-
! 

|-
! 

|-
! 

|-
! 

|-
! 

|-
! 
| Thomas Davee
|  | Democratic 
| 1836
| Incumbent re-elected.
| nowrap | 

|}

Maryland

Massachusetts 

Elections were held November 12, 1838, but one district's election went to a fourth ballot in 1839, after the March 4, 1839 start of the term but before the House convened in December 1839.

|-
! 
| Richard Fletcher
|  | Whig
| 1836
| Incumbent re-elected, but declined to serve, leading to a special election.
| nowrap | 

|-
! 
| Stephen C. Phillips
|  | Whig
| 1834 
|  | Incumbent resigned September 28, 1838 to become Mayor of Salem.New member elected.Whig hold.Successor also elected the same day to finish the current term.
| nowrap | 

|-
! 
| Caleb Cushing
|  | Whig
| 1834
| Incumbent re-elected.
| nowrap | 

|-
! 
| William Parmenter
|  | Democratic
| 1836
| Incumbent re-elected late on the fourth ballot.
| nowrap | 

|-
! 
| Levi Lincoln Jr.
|  | Whig
| 1834 
| Incumbent re-elected.
| nowrap | 

|-
! 
| George Grennell Jr.
|  | Whig
| 1834
|  | Incumbent retired.New member elected.Whig hold.
| nowrap | 

|-
! 
| George N. Briggs
|  | Whig
| 1830
| Incumbent re-elected.
| nowrap | 

|-
! 
| William Calhoun
|  | Whig
| 1834
| Incumbent re-elected.
| nowrap | 

|-
! 
| William S. Hastings
|  | Whig
| 1836
| Incumbent re-elected.
| nowrap | 

|-
! 
| Nathaniel B. Borden
|  | Democratic
| 1835
|  | Incumbent lost re-election from a different party.New member elected.Democratic hold.
| nowrap | 

|-
! 
| John Reed Jr.
|  | Whig
| 18121816 1820
| Incumbent re-elected.
| nowrap | 

|-
! 
| John Quincy Adams
|  | Whig
| 1830
| Incumbent re-elected.
| nowrap | 

|}

Michigan  

|-
! 
| Isaac E. Crary
| 
| 1835
| Incumbent re-elected.
| nowrap | 

|}

Mississippi 

A special election was held in Mississippi on July 17–18, 1837. Its winners were Democrats John F. H. Claiborne and Samuel J. Gholson. The first session of the 25th Congress was a special session beginning on September 4, 1837, extending to October 16. In November, Mississippi held the regular election. Seargent Smith Prentiss, a Vicksburg lawyer and Whig, unexpectedly launched a vigorous, partisan campaign. He and fellow Whig Thomas J. Word won in an upset. Claiborne and Gholson then argued that the July result entitled them to serve full terms. With the Whig Party newly organizing, the closely divided House, in which Anti-Masons, Nullifiers, and the Independent tended to align more with Whigs and to oppose Democrats, agreed to hear Prentiss. He spoke for nine hours over three days, packing the gallery, drawing Senators, and earning a national reputation for oratory and public admiration from leading Whigs including Senators Clay and Webster. The Elections Committee then required a third election. Scheduled for April 1838, it confirmed the November result. Both Whigs were seated in May late in the second session, also serving for the third session.

|-
! rowspan=2 | (2 seats)
| Seargent S. Prentiss
|  | Whig
| 1837
|  | Incumbent retired.New member elected.Democratic gain.
| nowrap rowspan=2 | 
|-
| Thomas J. Word
|  | Whig
| 1837
|  | Incumbent retired.New member elected.Democratic gain.

|}

Missouri

New Hampshire

New Jersey

New York

North Carolina

Ohio

Pennsylvania 

|-
! 
| Lemuel Paynter
|  | Democratic
| 1836
| Incumbent re-elected.
| nowrap | 

|-
! rowspan=2 | 
| John Sergeant
|  | Whig
| 18161836
| Incumbent re-elected.
| rowspan=2 nowrap | 

|-
| George W. Toland
|  | Whig
| 1836
| Incumbent re-elected.

|-
! 
| Charles Naylor
|  | Whig
| 1837 
| Incumbent re-elected.
| nowrap | 

|-
! rowspan=3 | 
| Edward Davies
|  | Anti-Masonic
| 1836
| Incumbent re-elected.
| rowspan=3 nowrap | 

|-
| Edward Darlington
|  | Anti-Masonic
| 1832
|  | Incumbent retired.New member elected.Anti-Masonic hold.

|-
| David Potts Jr.
|  | Anti-Masonic
| 1830
|  | Incumbent retired.New member elected.Anti-Masonic hold.

|-
! 
| Jacob Fry Jr.
|  | Democratic
| 1834
|  | Incumbent retired.New member elected.Democratic hold.
| nowrap | 

|-
! 
| Mathias Morris
|  | Whig
| 1834
|  | Incumbent lost re-election.New member elected.Democratic gain.
| nowrap | 

|-
! 
| David D. Wagener
|  | Democratic
| 1832
| Incumbent re-elected.
| nowrap | 

|-
! 
| Edward B. Hubley
|  | Democratic
| 1834
|  | Incumbent retired.New member elected.Democratic hold.
| nowrap | 

|-
! 
| George Keim
|  | Democratic
| 1838 
| Incumbent re-elected.
| nowrap | 

|-
! 
| Luther Reily
|  | Democratic
| 1836
|  | Incumbent retired.New member elected.Whig gain.
| nowrap | 

|-
! 
| Henry Logan
|  | Democratic
| 1834
|  | Incumbent retired.New member elected.Democratic hold.
| nowrap | 

|-
! 
| Daniel Sheffer
|  | Democratic
| 1836
|  | Incumbent lost re-election.New member elected.Whig gain.
| nowrap | 

|-
! 
| Charles McClure
|  | Democratic
| 1836
|  | Incumbent retired.New member elected.Democratic hold.
| nowrap | 

|-
! 
| William W. Potter
|  | Democratic
| 1836
| Incumbent re-elected.
| nowrap | 

|-
! 
| David Petrikin
|  | Democratic
| 1836
| Incumbent re-elected.
| nowrap | 

|-
! 
| Robert H. Hammond
|  | Democratic
| 1836
| Incumbent re-elected.
| nowrap | 

|-
! 
| Samuel W. Morris
|  | Democratic
| 1836
| Incumbent re-elected.
| nowrap | 

|-
! 
| Charles Ogle
|  | Anti-Masonic
| 1836
| Incumbent re-elected.
| nowrap | 

|-
! 
| John Klingensmith Jr.
|  | Democratic
| 1832
|  | Incumbent retired.New member elected.Democratic hold.
| nowrap | 

|-
! 
| Andrew Buchanan
|  | Democratic
| 1832
|  | Incumbent retired.New member elected.Democratic hold.
| nowrap | 

|-
! 
| Thomas M. T. McKennan
|  | Anti-Masonic
| 1830
|  | Incumbent retired.New member elected.Democratic gain.
| nowrap | 

|-
! 
| Richard Biddle
|  | Anti-Masonic
| 1836
| Incumbent re-elected.
| nowrap | 

|-
! 
| William Beatty
|  | Democratic
| 1836
| Incumbent re-elected.
| nowrap | 

|-
! 
| Thomas Henry
|  | Anti-Masonic
| 1836
| Incumbent re-elected.
| nowrap | 

|-
! 
| Arnold Plumer
|  | Democratic
| 1836
|  | Incumbent retired.New member elected.Democratic hold.
| nowrap | 

|}

There were three special elections in Pennsylvania during the 26th Congress. The first was in the  caused by the death of William W. Potter (Democratic) on October 28, 1839. This vacancy was filled by George McCulloch (Democratic). The second was in the  caused by the resignation of Richard Biddle.  This vacancy was filled by Henry M. Brackenridge (Whig). The third was in the  caused by the death of William S. Ramsey (Democratic) on October 17, 1840.  Ramsey had also been re-elected to the 27th Congress and so an additional special election was held the following May to fill the vacancy in the 27th Congress.

Rhode Island

South Carolina

Tennessee 

Elections held late, on August 1, 1839.

|-
! 
| William B. Carter
|  | Whig
| 1835
| Incumbent re-elected.
| nowrap | 

|-
! 
| Abraham McClellan
|  | Democratic
| 1837
| Incumbent re-elected.
| nowrap | 

|-
! 
| Joseph L. Williams
|  | Whig
| 1837
| Incumbent re-elected.
| nowrap | 

|-
! 
| William Stone
|  | Whig
| 1837 (special)
|  |Incumbent lost re-election.New member elected.Democratic gain.
| nowrap | 

|-
! 
| Hopkins L. Turney
|  | Democratic
| 1837
| Incumbent re-elected.
| nowrap | 

|-
! 
| William B. Campbell
|  | Whig
| 1837
| Incumbent re-elected.
| nowrap | 

|-
! 
| John Bell
|  | Whig
| 1827
| Incumbent re-elected.
| nowrap | 

|-
! 
| Abram P. Maury
|  | Whig
| 1835
|  |Incumbent retired.New member elected.Whig hold.
| nowrap | 

|-
! 
| James K. Polk
|  | Democratic
| 1825 
|  |Incumbent retired to run for Governor.New member elected.Democratic hold.
| nowrap | 

|-
! 
| Ebenezer J. Shields
|  | Whig
| 1835
|  | Incumbent lost re-election.New member elected.Democratic gain.
| nowrap | 

|-
! 
| Richard Cheatham
|  | Whig
| 1837 
|  |Incumbent lost re-election.New member elected.Democratic gain.
| nowrap | 

|-
! 
| John W. Crockett
|  | Whig
| 1837 
| Incumbent re-elected.
| nowrap | 

|-
! 
| Christopher H. Williams
|  | Whig
| 1837 
| Incumbent re-elected.
| nowrap | 

|}

Vermont

Virginia

Wisconsin Territory 
See Non-voting delegates, below.

Non-voting delegates

25th Congress 

|-
! 
| colspan=3 | New district
|  | New seat.New delegate elected September 10, 1848.Democratic gain.
| nowrap | 

|}

26th Congress 

|-
! 
| Charles Downing
|  | Democratic
| 1836
| Incumbent re-elected on an unknown date.
| nowrap | 

|-
! 
| William W. Chapman
|  | Democratic
| 1838
| Incumbent lost re-election.New delegate elected August 5, 1839, but election was invalidated due to a misdrafting of the a territorial statute, and Congress extended the term of the incumbent delegate to 1840.
| nowrap | 

|-
! 
| George Wallace Jones
|  | Democratic
| 1836
|  | Incumbent lost re-election.New delegate elected in September 1838.Democratic hold.Incumbent claimed that prior 1836 election had entitled him to serve until March 1839, but the house disagreed and seated the winner January 14, 1839.
| nowrap | 

|}

See also
 1838 United States elections
 List of United States House of Representatives elections (1824–1854)
 1838–39 United States Senate elections
 25th United States Congress
 26th United States Congress

Notes

References

Bibliography

External links
 Office of the Historian (Office of Art & Archives, Office of the Clerk, U.S. House of Representatives)